Andrea Fantoni (1659–1734) was an Italian sculptor and woodcarver of the late-Baroque period, active in the region near Bergamo.

He was born in Rovetta in 1659, and he died in Bergamo in 1734. He trained with his family of artisans as well as the noted wood carver Pietro Ramus (1639–1682), and then traveled to Parma to work in the Palazzo Ducale. He returned to Rovetta in 1679. His studio produced a variety of works, including statues, reliefs, and wood carving. He is best known for his wooden confessional from the Basilica of Santa Maria Maggiore, Bergamo, and the Duomo of St. Alessandro in Brescia, as well as the pulpit in the Basilica di San Martino at Alzano Lombardo. There are also some altar at a parish churches in the valle Camonica near Cerveno and Angolo Terme. In Clusone, in the Basilica of Santa Maria Assunta are a number of sculptures. He also has works in the Ognissanti church in  Rovetta.

References

External links

Biography 
Museo Fantoni. 

1659 births
1734 deaths
Artists from the Province of Bergamo
17th-century Italian sculptors
Italian male sculptors
18th-century Italian sculptors
Italian Baroque sculptors
18th-century Italian male artists